Enrique Hanabergh (21 February 1922 – 14 April 1960) was a Colombian sports shooter. He competed in the 25 metre pistol and the 50 metre pistol events at the 1956 Summer Olympics.

References

External links
 

1922 births
1960 deaths
Colombian male sport shooters
Olympic shooters of Colombia
Shooters at the 1956 Summer Olympics
Place of birth missing